Aubrey Ellis Strode (October 2, 1873 – May 17, 1946) was an American lawyer and politician. A Democrat, he was a member of the Virginia Senate, representing the state's 19th district. He was a strong advocate for Jim Crow laws.  Strode authored Virginia's sterilization law (Racial Integrity Act of 1924). Strode wrote the Virginia Law Review in 1925 for sterilization. Strode also represented the Virginia State Colony for Epileptics and Feebleminded in its court case for forced sterilizations of people identified as morons (feebleminded) based on eugenics arguments. Strode argued the test case for the forced Sterilization of Carrie Buck before the U.S. Supreme Court. Buck’s attorney was  a friend of Strode's since childhood, Irving Whitehead, who had also served on the Colony's board.

References

External links

1873 births
1946 deaths
University of Mississippi alumni
University of Virginia alumni
Democratic Party Virginia state senators
People from Amherst, Virginia